Lesbian, gay, bisexual, transgender (LGBT+) rights in Sweden are regarded as some of the most progressive in Europe and in the world in regards to gay rights, but significantly less so regarding trans rights. Same-sex sexual activity was legalized in 1944 and the age of consent was equalized to that of heterosexual activity in 1972. Sweden also became the first country in the world to allow transgender people to change their legal gender post-sex reassignment surgery in 1972 whilst transvestism was declassified as an illness. Legislation allowing legal gender changes without hormone replacement therapy and sex reassignment surgery was passed in 2013.

After allowing same-sex couples to register for partnership benefits in 1995, Sweden became the seventh country in the world to legalize same-sex marriage in 2009. Discrimination on the basis of sexual orientation has been banned since 1987 and on the basis of gender identity and expression since 2009. Gay and lesbian couples can petition to adopt since 2003, and lesbian couples have had equal access to IVF and assisted insemination since 2005. Sweden has been recognized as one of the most socially liberal countries in Europe and in the world, with recent polls indicating that a large majority of Swedes support LGBT rights and same-sex marriage. Polling from the 2019 Eurobarometer showed that 98% of Swedes believed gay and bisexual people should enjoy the same rights as heterosexual people, the highest in the European Union, and 92% supported same-sex marriage.

Law regarding same-sex sexual activity
Sweden legalised same-sex sexual activity in 1944, with the age of consent set at 18. In 1987, in order to combat the spread of HIV, the Riksdag passed a law against sex in gay saunas and against prostitution. It was repealed in 2004. In 1972, Sweden became the first country in the world to allow transgender people to legally change their sex, provided free hormone therapy, and an equal age of consent was set at 18. However, the requirements under the 1972 act for changing gender included being unmarried, a Swedish citizen and infertile. This was followed by an activist occupation of the main office of the National Board of Health and Welfare. In October 1979, Sweden joined the few other countries in the world at the time to declassify homosexuality as an illness. Being transgender was declassified as an illness in 2017.

Recognition of same-sex relationships

Registered partnership
Same-sex couples in Sweden had the right to register their partnerships from 1995 onwards. These partnerships had all the rights of marriages except "as provided by sections 3–4" of the law. As well, all provisions of a statute or any other legislation related to marriage or spouses applied to registered partnerships and partners, except as under sections 3–4.

Since May 2009, new registered partnerships can no longer be entered into due to the legalization of same-sex marriage. The status of existing partnerships remains unaltered, except that they can be converted to marriage if the couple so desires.

Same-sex marriage

Effective 1 May 2009, marriage between two people of the same sex has been legal in Sweden after a government report published in March 2007, written by former Chancellor of Justice Hans Regner, proposing that marriage be extended to same-sex couples.

On 1 April 2009, the Riksdag voted on a change to the law, legalizing same-sex marriages. All parties supported the proposal, with the exception of the Christian Democrats. The Swedish Cabinet Government, under whom this legislation was passed, consisted of the Moderate Party, the Centre Party, the Liberals and the Christian Democrats.

On 22 October 2009, the Assembly of the Church of Sweden voted in favour of giving its blessing to same-sex couples, including the use of the term for marriage: äktenskap ("matrimony"). The new rules were introduced on 1 November 2009.

Royal family in Sweden
In October 2021, it was legally confirmed that any member of the royal family in Sweden who enters into a same-sex marriage will retain all the same responsibilities, obligations, rights and/or privileges as any other citizen, so rights to the throne would be unaffected.

Adoption and family planning

Since 1 February 2003, registered partners have had the same adoption rights as married couples. Single LGBT individuals are permitted to adopt as well. With regard to foreign adoptions, the Ministry of Justice states: "As regards adoption from abroad, it is important that we are sensitive and aware that those countries with which Sweden cooperates often hold a different view on homosexual people and homosexual parenthood. Cooperation regarding intercountry adoptions must be based on trust. This means that the limitations and terms that the countries of origin lay down must be complied with."

In 2005, a new law was passed allowing lesbian couples to access assisted insemination in public hospitals.

Military service

LGBT people are not banned from military service. Sweden explicitly allows LGBT people to serve openly in the military. Sweden was amongst the first nations in the world to allow LGBT people to serve. In fact, gay men were allowed to serve even before Sweden demedicalized homosexuality in 1979.

The Swedish Armed Forces states that it actively works for an environment where individuals do not feel it to be necessary to hide their sexual orientation or gender identity. In 2015, they launched a Pride campaign featuring a soldier in uniform with the rainbow flag badget to her arm. The text's bold letters translates to "Some things you should not have to camouflage," followed by the text "Equality is an important ingredient in a democracy. In the military, we treat each other with respect and see our differences as a strength. We are an inclusive organisation where all who serve and contribute should feel welcomed and respected".

Transgender rights
The ability to legally change the gender marker on official identification documents in Sweden has been possible since 1972. However, certain criteria had to be met: one had to be a Swedish citizen and 18 years old, unmarried (having divorced if necessary), have lived for two years as the opposite gender, be sterilized and have undergone sex reassignment surgery. The law was re-evaluated in 2007, proposing removals of the requirements to be a Swedish citizen, unmarried and sterilized, and presented to the Christian Democrat Minister for Health and Social Affairs. 

The Swedish Discrimination Ombudsman (DO) and the Swedish Federation for Lesbian, Gay, Bisexual and Transgender Rights inquired about the future of the proposed new law. In January 2013, the Stockholm Administrative Court of Appeal deemed the requirements to be sterilized and undergo sex reassignment surgery in order to change gender unconstitutional, and the requirement was thus de facto abolished. In July of the same year, the requirements were removed de jure as the Riksdag passed an amendment to the law to remove the requirements. Sterilization had been in effect since 1972, and is thought to have been performed on 500 to 800 transgender people.

In March 2017, the Löfven Government announced it would compensate an estimated 800 transgender people who were forced to undergo sex reassignment surgery and be sterilized so as to have their sex legally reassigned. In late March 2018, the Swedish Parliament approved the move. The compensation amount is 225,000 SEK (some 21,000 euros/27,000 U.S. dollars) per person.

In January 2018, the majority of the parties in the Riksdag were interested in researching the possibility of introducing a third legal gender on official documents.

Proposed gender law reform

In February 2015, the Löfven Government introduced two bills. The first one allowing legal gender change without any form of psychiatric or psychological evaluation as well as the need of a diagnosis or any kind of medical intervention. The other one allowing sex reassignment surgery if the person applying for it submits a positive opinion from a psychiatrist. As of 2019, the bills remained pending and had been the subject of several public consultations. As of August 2020, the bills were still in an early draft form. In November 2021 a new proposal was sent for consideration to various governmental and non-governmental organisations.

In July 2022 the government submitted a new law proposal to the Legislative Council. This proposal changed the requirements in the law for a legal gender change, which in previous drafts had been changed to an administrative process, to still require a simplified medical process. It also includes an increase of the proposed age at which the legal gender can be changed from the previous 12 to 16.  the government plans to present the law for a vote in the Riksdag after the election in September, with the law to take force on 1 October 2024.

Access to healthcare

In Sweden, patients seeking to access gender affirming healthcare must first undergo extended evaluations with psychiatric professionals, during which they must - without any form of medical transition - successfully live for one full year as their desired gender in all professional, social, and personal matters. Gender clinics are recommended to provide patients with wigs and breast prostheses for the endeavor. Further, those with potential comorbidities are subject to additional long-term scrutiny prior to allowance of any sort of access to medical care. The evaluation additionally involves meetings with family members and other individuals close to the patient. Patients may be denied care for any number of "psychosocial dimensions", including their choice of job or their marital status.

In 2022, gender affirming healthcare, including puberty blockers and hormone therapy, for those under 18 was banned in Sweden outside of research settings.

All of the above regulations for both minors and adults are currently counter to the best practice recommendations set forth in the World Professional Association of Transgender Health's Standards of Care Version 8.

In 2021, the Swedish National Board of Health and Welfare reduced the number of clinics allowed to provide gender affirming healthcare from seven to three. Those three clinics have yet to be chosen.

In March 2023, it was reported that sexual reassignment surgery will be legally banned for children and minors within Sweden under recent health policies.

Discrimination protections
Unfair discrimination against gay men, lesbians and bisexuals has been outlawed under the Penal Code since 1987. In 2008, transgender identity or expression was added to a new unified discrimination code which came into force on 1 January 2009.

Since 2002, the Constitution of Sweden has banned discrimination on the grounds of "sexual orientation". Article 12 states:

In 2002 the Riksdag also voted to add sexual orientation as a basis for the crime of hate speech, with the law taking effect on 1 January 2003.

Until 2009, the Swedish Ombudsman against Discrimination on Grounds of Sexual Orientation, normally referred to as HomO, was the Swedish office of the ombudsman against discrimination on grounds of sexual orientation. It ceased to exist on 1 January 2009, and was merged with the other ombudsmen against discrimination into a new body: the Discrimination Ombudsman. The previously existing acts against discrimination were also replaced with a new discrimination act.

The term HomO was used both to refer to the office and the title of its government-appointed acting head; the last HomO was Hans Ytterberg. The HomO investigated grievances of individuals and filed class action suits on their behalf, for example a successful action against a restaurant owner in Stockholm who had harassed a lesbian couple. The HomO office was key in taking a number of initiatives of its own and submitting parliamentary proposals, such as the legalisation of same-sex marriage.

On 16 May 2018, the Swedish Parliament added "transgender identity and expression" to the country's hate crime legislation, effective on 1 July 2018. Sexual orientation was added in 2010. The Parliament also voted to add "transgender identity and expression" to the country's hate speech law, effective on 1 January 2019. 

Sweden's hate speech law has been criticised for being "selectively applied", as the Swedish authorities refused to prosecute a Halmstad imam who in 2015 called homosexuality a "virus". The move was condemned by the Swedish Federation for Lesbian, Gay, Bisexual and Transgender Rights, which expressed fears that his views might spread to the wider Muslim community in Sweden. Mohamed Omar, a Muslim blogger, claims that homophobia in the Swedish Muslim community is very mainstream. Omar claims that "during my years as a Muslim, I have visited a number of Swedish mosques from north to south. In all, homophobia has been normal. I have heard worse things than "homosexuality is a virus". In no mosque, I repeat [none], have I encountered a teaching that tolerates homosexuality".

However, previous prosecutions against preachers of other religions have also failed, such as in the case of Åke Green, a pentecostal preacher who was prosecuted for hate speech after a 2003 sermon where he described homosexuality as "a sexual abnormality" and compared it to "a cancer on the body politic". Green was convicted in the district court but acquitted in both the court of appeal and Supreme Court, with the Supreme Court arguing that the protections for religious speech in the European Convention on Human Rights meant that the otherwise illegal hate speech could not be punished as a criminal act.

Blood donation
In the autumn of 2008, the National Board of Health and Welfare proposed that men who have sex with men (MSM) should become eligible to donate blood, but only after a six-month deferral period after sexual intercourse. An earlier proposition in 2006 to allow MSMs to donate blood was rejected. From 1 March 2010, men who have sex with men were supposed to be allowed to donate blood, after one year of abstaining from sex, but the blood banks rejected the law, causing delay until 1 October 2011 at the latest. This allowed them time to adapt to the new regulations. In November 2011, all blood banks in Sweden were instructed to begin accepting donations by gay and bisexual men, provided they haven't had sex in a year. Starting from 1 May 2021 all blood banks in Sweden accept donations from men who have sex with men that haven't had sex in 6 months.

Public opinion

According to the International Lesbian, Gay, Bisexual, Trans and Intersex Association (ILGA), Sweden is one of Europe's most gay-friendly countries, with extensive legislation protecting gay and lesbian rights, including anti-discrimination and same-sex marriage legislation. A 2006 European Union member poll showed that 71% of Swedes supported same-sex marriage. The 2015 Eurobarometer found that 90% of Swedes thought that same-sex marriage should be allowed throughout Europe, 7% were against.

In May 2015, PlanetRomeo, an LGBT social network, published its first Gay Happiness Index (GHI). Gay men from over 120 countries were asked about how they feel about society's view on homosexuality, how do they experience the way they are treated by other people and how satisfied are they with their lives. Sweden was ranked fourth with a GHI score of 73.

The 2019 Eurobarometer showed that 98% of Swedes believed gay and bisexual people should enjoy the same rights as heterosexual people, and 92% supported same-sex marriage.

LGBT rights movement in Sweden

The Swedish Federation for Lesbian, Gay, Bisexual and Transgender Rights (RFSL; Riksförbundet för homosexuellas, bisexuellas, transpersoners och queeras rättigheter), one of the world's oldest LGBT organizations, originated in October 1950 as a Swedish branch of the Danish Federation of 1948. In April 1952, RFSL adopted its current name and declared itself as an independent organization. In 2009, it had 28 branches throughout Sweden, from Piteå in the north to Malmö in the south, with over 6,000 members.

RFSL works for LGBT people through political lobbying, the dissemination of information, and the organization of social and support activities. Internationally, RFSL works with the ILGA and also collaborates with other LGBT organizations in neighboring countries. The federation operates counseling centers for both women and men in Stockholm, Gothenburg and Malmö. The counseling is intended for people who wish to talk about coming out, sex, HIV/AIDS and other health issues, and relationships, as well as those who need assistance in their contact with the authorities and healthcare institutions, or who require legal assistance with, for example, asylum and wills.

Following the Stonewall riots in New York City in 1969, several more organizations were established in Sweden, including Uppsala Förening för Homosexuella (Uppsala Association for Homosexuals), founded in 1971 in the city of Uppsala, and Gay Power Club from Örebro. The latter organized the first public gay demonstration in Sweden on 15 May 1971, with about fifteen participants. Further demonstrations in Uppsala were held a few weeks later and then in Stockholm on 27 June. There was disagreement within the RFSL in the 1970s, with younger activists advocating a more "radical" movement with public demonstrations, and many feeling the group had failed to address the rights of lesbians and bisexuals. In 1975, several members of the group split to form their own association, the Lesbian Front (Lesbisk Front). LGBT groups saw their first political victories during this period; in 1973 the Riksdag stated that "homosexual coexistence is from a social point of view a fully acceptable coexistence", and in 1978 the state appointed an inquiry into the living conditions of gays and lesbians in Sweden. The inquiry suggested a ban on unlawful discrimination, refugee status for perecuted LGBT people, constitutional protections for gays and lesbians and a cohabitation law between same-sex couples.

Sweden is frequently referred to as one of the world's most LGBT-tolerant and accepting countries, with various organisations and venues catering to LGBT people, supportive laws and policies, and high public and societal acceptance. Legislation concerning marriage, anti-discrimination and adoption have all been amended in the past decades to specifically apply to LGBT people and same-sex couples. In 2009, Sweden became the seventh country in the world to legalise same-sex marriage, after the Netherlands, Belgium, Spain, Canada, South Africa and Norway. The move was supported by parties across the political spectrum, as well as the Church of Sweden, the former state church (slightly less than two-thirds of Swedes are members). 2015 polling found that Swedes are the second-most supportive of same-sex marriage within the European Union at 90%, behind the Netherlands at 91%. This high societal tolerance has allowed Swedish LGBT people to come out, establish various associations, and "enjoy the same rights and obligations as everybody else". In March 2019, Sweden was named the world's best LGBT-friendly travel destination, along with Canada and Portugal. Neighbouring Norway, Denmark, Iceland and Finland were all ranked forth. Sweden also hosts several gay pride festivals every year. Stockholm Pride is the biggest and oldest such festival, and has been organized annually since 1998. The event is usually attended by half a million spectators, including about 40,000 who participate in the march itself. In later years, pride festivals have also been arranged in Gothenburg, Malmö and Uppsala, and local pride events are also hosted in smaller communities, including Lund, Örebro, Halmstad, Falun and others. In addition, Sápmi Pride is held in the far north, rotating between Norway, Finland and Sweden every year. It was first held in 2014 in Kiruna. Apart from pride festivities, these cities also host a range of gays clubs, bars, cafés and other venues.

One should also highlight that sexual rights of sub-groups LGBT such as migrant LGBT are violated to a larger extent than other groups. According to a study conducted in 2021, migrant LGBT group have worse sexual health, refrained more from visiting healthcare, were more exposed to sexual violence and more dissatisfied with sexual life.

Summary table

See also

LGBT history in Sweden
Politics of Sweden
LGBT rights in Europe
 LGBT rights in the European Union

Notes

Further reading
 Carlson-Rainer, Elise. "Sweden Is a World Leader in Peace, Security, and Human Rights." World Affairs 180.4 (2017): 79–85. online
 Rydström, J. Sinners and citizens: Bestiality and homosexuality in Sweden, 1880–1950 (U of Chicago Press, 2003) online.
 Rydström J. & K. Mustola, eds. Criminally queer: homosexuality and criminal law in Scandinavia 1842–1999 (Amsterdam: Aksant, 2007). online
 Sundevall, Fia, and Alma Persson. "LGBT in the military: policy development in Sweden 1944–2014." Sexuality Research and Social Policy 13.2 (2016): 119–129. online

External links

Official site for HomO (English)